Mark Edward Lindsay (born 6 March 1958) is an English retired professional footballer who played as a midfielder.

Career
Born in Lambeth, Lindsay began his youth career at Crystal Palace, and signed professional terms in August 1973. He made 30 appearances in the Football League for the club.

He later played in the United States, spending nine seasons in the North American Soccer League, three in the Major Indoor Soccer League, and one in the American Indoor Soccer Association, playing with Tampa Bay Rowdies, Houston Hurricane, Houston Summit, California Surf, San Jose Earthquakes, Jacksonville Tea Men, Baltimore Blast and Los Angeles Lazers.

References

1955 births
Living people
Footballers from the London Borough of Lambeth
English footballers
Crystal Palace F.C. players
Tampa Bay Rowdies (1975–1993) players
Houston Hurricane players
Houston Summit players
California Surf players
San Jose Earthquakes (1974–1988) players
Jacksonville Tea Men players
Baltimore Blast (1980–1992) players
Los Angeles Lazers players
English Football League players
North American Soccer League (1968–1984) players
North American Soccer League (1968–1984) indoor players
Major Indoor Soccer League (1978–1992) players
American Indoor Soccer Association players
Association football midfielders
English expatriate footballers
English expatriate sportspeople in the United States
Expatriate soccer players in the United States